Roger Gomis (born 5 September 1994) is a Senegalese professional football midfielder who plays for AS Douanes.

Football career
Born in Ziguinchor, Gomis played for Senegalese football teams, and arrived in France at the age of 20 as he signed for CS Louhans-Cuiseaux in the Championnat de France Amateur 2.

In March 2017 he signed contract with the Ukrainian FC Illichivets Mariupol.

In February 2020, Gomis returned to Senegal. He officially joined Teungueth FC on 11 March 2020. In May 2021, Gomis joined AS Douanes.

References

External links

1995 births
Living people
People from Ziguinchor
Senegalese footballers
Association football midfielders
US Gorée players
Louhans-Cuiseaux FC players
FC Mariupol players
CA Bizertin players
Ukrainian Premier League players
Championnat National 3 players
Senegalese expatriate footballers
Expatriate footballers in France
Senegalese expatriate sportspeople in France
Expatriate footballers in Ukraine
Senegalese expatriate sportspeople in Ukraine
Expatriate footballers in Tunisia
Senegalese expatriate sportspeople in Tunisia